Dr. Philip 'Flip' Nissen Froelich, Jr. is an American academic oceanographic scientist, whose research uses biogeochemistry dynamics to address human impacts on the world's oceans.

Early life and career
Froelich graduated from Duke University in 1968.  He obtained a Ph.D. from the University of Rhode Island in 1979.

He is a Francis Eppes Professor of Oceanography at Florida State University, where he is involved in the interdisciplinary Biogeochemical Dynamics Program.  He is also affiliated with the National High Magnetic Field Laboratory.

References

External links
 Florida State University faculty profile

Duke University alumni
Florida State University faculty
American oceanographers
Living people
Biogeochemists
Year of birth missing (living people)